The 1918 Notre Dame Fighting Irish football team represented the University of Notre Dame during the 1918 college football season.

At age thirty, Knute Rockne made his head coaching debut on September 28 against Case (now Case Western Reserve) in Cleveland,  This team included George Gipp, Hunk Anderson, and Curly Lambeau, founder and head coach of the NFL's Green Bay Packers.

The schedule was curtailed from its usual 9 games to 6 due to the outbreak of the worldwide influenza epidemic. Therefore, no games were played during the month of October.

"On Oct. 11, Dr. Emil G. Freyermuth, the South Bend city health officer, issued an order forbidding all public gatherings until further notice. All schools, theaters, clubs, churches and other religious institutions were closed. Public funerals, meetings, dances and other events were canceled. The University of Notre Dame football team — led by coach Knute Rockne and including star player George Gipp — canceled several football games that month."

Schedule

References

Notre Dame
Notre Dame Fighting Irish football seasons
Notre Dame Fighting Irish football